The American Elm cultivar Ulmus americana 'Skinner Upright' was raised by Skinner's Nursery, Roblin, Manitoba, in 1954.

Description
Not available.

Cultivation
Specimens were once grown at the arboretum of the Morden Research Station, Manitoba, but, without any known resistance to Dutch elm disease, it is unlikely the tree remains in cultivation in North America or beyond.

Synonymy
'Skinner's Upright'. Anon.

References

American elm cultivar
Ulmus articles missing images
Ulmus